The Scarlet Letter is a 1979 miniseries based on the 1850 novel of the same name by Nathaniel Hawthorne: it aired on WGBH from March 3, 1979 to March 24, 1979. The series is four episodes long, 60 minutes each. Part 2 won the 1979 Emmy Award for Outstanding Video Tape Editing for a Limited Series or Special for film editors Ken Denisoff, Janet McFadden, and Tucker Wiard.

In 1979, when most literary programs were being produced in the United Kingdom, Boston public television station WGBH decided to produce a homegrown literary classic of its own. The result was this version of Hawthorne's enduring novel of Puritan America in search of its soul. Hester Prynne becomes stigmatized after committing adultery, and is doomed to live with the consequences forever. Hawthorne's themes, the nature of sin, social hypocrisy, and community repression, still reverberate through American society.

Hester Prynne (Meg Foster) is a young, Puritan woman who commits adultery while her husband is in Europe, and, upon the birth of her illegitimate child, is subsequently condemned to wear a scarlet "A" for the rest of her life. Her secret partner, the Reverend Arthur Dimmesdale, (John Heard) writhes in private torment as he deals with hiding his sin. The person of Hester's husband, Roger Chillingworth (Kevin Conway) completes this grim triangle as the mysterious situation leads to a shattering climax. The story follows the main characters as they grapple with sin, forgiveness, and redemption.

Cast
Josef Sommer as Nathaniel Hawthorne
Meg Foster as Hester Prynne
Elisa Erali as Pearl Prynne
John Heard as Reverend Arthur Dimmesdale
Kevin Conway as Roger Chillingworth
George Martin as the Rev. Mr. Wilson

Crew
Directed by Rick Hauser
Writing credits: Nathaniel Hawthorne, Allan Knee, and Alvin Sapinsley
Produced by Rick Hauser and Herbert Hirschman
Original music by John Morris
Cinematography by Bob Collins
Film editing by Ken Denisoff, Janet McFadden, and Tucker Wiard

References

External links
 

1970s American television miniseries
Adultery in television
Films based on The Scarlet Letter
Films scored by John Morris
Television series by WGBH